The 1996 BPR 4 Hours of Monza was the second race of the 1996 BPR Global GT Series.  It was run at the Autodromo Nazionale Monza on 24 March 1996.

Official results
Class winners in bold.  Cars failing to complete 75% of winner's distance marked as Not Classified (NC).

Statistics
 Pole Position - Jean-Marc Gounon (#1 West Competition) - 1:43.045
 Fastest Lap - Ray Bellm (#2 Gulf Racing) - 1:44.354

References

External links
 Race Results
 Photo Archive

Monza
Monza